The Fessenden School is an independent day (Pre-K – Grade 9) and boarding school (Grades 5 – 9) for boys, founded in 1903 by Frederick J. Fessenden as a school for the intellectually gifted, and located at 250 Waltham Street, West Newton, Massachusetts, United States, on a  campus.

Notable alumni

Lex Barker – American actor best known for playing Tarzan in Tarzan of the Apes.
Hugh DeHaven – American professor at Cornell University and considered the "Father of Crash Survivability".
James Franciscus – American actor who appeared in movies and television programs in the 1960s and 1970s.
Edward Hallowell – Physician and international authority on attention deficit disorder.
Howard R. Hughes – American aviator, industrialist and film producer/director. He attended the school in 1921.
Porter Goss – Director of the Central Intelligence Agency from 2004 to 2006, United States Representative from Florida from 1989 to 2004.
Patrick J. Kennedy – former United States Representative from Rhode Island.
Edward M. Kennedy – United States Senator from Massachusetts from 1962 to 2009.
John Kerry – Former United States Secretary of State, Former United States Senator from Massachusetts and  Democratic candidate for President of United States in 2004.
Sol Kumin - Businessman, philanthropist and racehorse owner.  
Christopher Lloyd – Three-time Emmy Award-winning actor. Best known for the Back to the Future trilogy.
Douglas Moore – Pulitzer Prize winner, Columbia music professor, and legendary figure in American Opera for works including The Ballad of Baby Doe, The Devil and Daniel Webster, and Giants of the Earth. Moore also wrote the school song "Song of Fessenden."
Matt Nathanson, Singer-songwriter
William Scranton – Governor of Pennsylvania from 1963 to 1967 and United States Ambassador to the United Nations from 1976 to 1977.
Gerardo Torrado – Mexican soccer player who plays for Cruz Azul in the Primera División de México.
Sheanon Williams – Member of the U20 U.S. national soccer team. Current member of MLS, Philadelphia Union
Alex Oriakhi  – Member of Erie BayHawks basketball team in the NBA Development League, former member of UConn Huskies, 2010–11 national champion and of the Missouri Tigers basketball team. He was drafted 57th overall by the Phoenix Suns in the 2013 NBA Draft
Charles Nesson – the William F. Weld Professor of Law at Harvard Law School
Ben Kurland- an actor best known for his role in the Academy Award winning film The Artist.

Notes

 Peterson's, Private Secondary Schools 2008, page 1278. .
Fessenden also operates a co-ed summer camp.

External links

 Official Website

Educational institutions established in 1903
Schools in Middlesex County, Massachusetts
Private middle schools in Massachusetts
1903 establishments in Massachusetts
Boarding schools in Massachusetts